Nathan Michael Mulligan (born 15 September 1986) is an English footballer who plays for Stockton Town as a midfielder.

Career
Born in Middlesbrough, Mulligan is a former scholar at Middlesbrough's Academy whose progress was halted when he contracted a form of cancer. He made a full recovery but failed to make the first team squad and left to the club to join Norton & Stockton Ancients.

In October 2009 he signed for Darlington and made his league debut in a 2–1 away defeat to Hereford United on 31 October 2009.

He was released by the club following their relegation from League 2, along with 13 other players.

After playing for Whitby Town and Guisborough Town, he signed for Marske United in 2015. He subsequently moved on to Billingham Synthonia before signing for Stockton Town in July 2017.

References

External links

Nathan Mulligan profile at the Darlington website

1986 births
Living people
Footballers from Middlesbrough
English footballers
Association football midfielders
Middlesbrough F.C. players
Darlington F.C. players
Whitby Town F.C. players
Norton & Stockton Ancients F.C. players
Guisborough Town F.C. players
Marske United F.C. players
Billingham Synthonia F.C. players
Stockton Town F.C. players
English Football League players
Northern Premier League players